Iván Alejandro Anderson Hernández (born 24 November 1997) is a Panamanian professional footballer who plays as a defender for Venezuelan Primera División club Monagas and the Panama national team.

International career
Anderson is a former Panamanian youth national team player. He was part of Panama's squad at 2019 Pan American Games.

On 27 January 2019, Anderson made his senior team debut in a 3–0 friendly defeat against the United States.

Career statistics

International

References

External links
 

1997 births
Living people
Sportspeople from Panama City
Association football defenders
Panamanian footballers
Panama youth international footballers
Panama international footballers
Liga Panameña de Fútbol players
Tauro F.C. players
Unión Deportivo Universitario players
Footballers at the 2019 Pan American Games
Pan American Games competitors for Panama